The Association for Uncrewed Vehicle Systems International, also known as AUVSI, is an international nonprofit organization dedicated to promoting and supporting the unmanned systems and robotics industry through communication, education and leadership.

History 

AUVSI was established in 1972 when the use of target drones as reconnaissance assets during the Vietnam War prompted a group of U.S. Air Force officers and contractors in Dayton, Ohio to form the National Association of Remotely Piloted Vehicles (NARPV), which would later become known as AUVSI. Founding fathers:

1) LT Col Harold F. (Red) Smith - Drone/ RPV SPO, ASD

2) Charles B (Barney) Bagwell - Lear Seigler

3) Robert T Boone - Teledyne Ryan

4) Milan Filcik - Northrop Corporation

5) William Mallios - Civil Service Employee, ASD

6) John E. Short- WPAFB Special Assistant to the Director Recce, Strike, E.W.

By the end of the war the potential for unmanned systems technology was evident and the momentum of industry growth was moving quickly. In 1974, the Wright Kettering Chapter in Ohio hosted the first national symposium, which was met with great success.

By the late 1970s, RPVs were being called Unmanned Air Vehicles (UAVs). The newly recognized term “unmanned” encompassed more than air vehicles, and recognition of the growing developments in the ground, maritime and space arenas caused the organization to broaden its reach. In 1978, the NARPV expanded its focus and services to create a community inclusive of all unmanned systems disciplines. At that time the organization changed its name to the Association for Unmanned Vehicle Systems (AUVS). The organization continued to thrive, and in 1982 the headquarters moved from Dayton to Washington, DC.

Through the 1980s and 1990s, AUVS mirrored the fast pace of growth of the worldwide unmanned systems industry, and the need for the organization's services began to reach far beyond Washington, D.C. In 1996, the AUVS became the Association for Unmanned Vehicle Systems International (AUVSI) to reflect the true scope of the organization.

By 2003, AUVSI's global activities led to the creation of the International Opportunities Program (IOP), a campaign to raise awareness of AUVSI, increase member services and strengthen the worldwide network of the unmanned systems industry. The program was successful, and AUVSI's global activities are now a fundamental part of the association's operations. International outreach is no longer referred to as the IOP.

AUVSI continues to promote and support the unmanned systems and robotics community and now serves more than 7,000 members worldwide from government organizations, industry and academia.

Overview 

AUVSI's mission is to promote and support the unmanned systems community through communication, education and leadership. The organization serves a membership of more than 7,000 people from 60 countries. Based in the U.S., the association has two regional affiliates, Unmanned Systems Canada and AUVS-Australia, and 26 International Member Groups (chapters).

AUVSI also sponsors a number of international conferences and student competitions each year. The association's annual conference and exhibition, AUVSI's Unmanned Systems North America, is the largest unmanned systems event in the world.

Activities 
AUVSI is known as a forum for those involved with unmanned systems and robotics from business, government and academia. The association hosts meetings and provides a number of informational products and services.

AUVSI's Unmanned Systems North America AUVSI's Unmanned Systems North America is the only event in the world that brings together the entire unmanned systems and robotics community. The largest international event for the unmanned systems market, annual growth has led to record-breaking attendance and expanding exhibit halls to accommodate more than 500 exhibitors annually.

AUVSI's Unmanned Systems Program Review AUVSI's Unmanned Systems Program Review is an annual event that provides the most up-to-date overviews and information on government and industry programs for air, ground and maritime systems.

Online Forum AUVSI's Online Forum is a venue for the interactive exchange of unmanned systems information, ideas, discussions and issues of mutual interest to users.

AUVSI Foundation (RoboNation) The AUVSI Foundation is a 501(c)(3) charitable organization that was established to support the educational initiatives of the Association for Unmanned Vehicle Systems International. The AUVSI Foundation focuses on the future of the robotics industry by developing programs that will attract and equip students for a career in this rapidly growing field.

Through a variety of efforts, the AUVSI Foundation provides students with the opportunity to experience fun, hands-on robotics activities that promote STEM education (science, technology, engineering and math).

At the K-12 level, the foundation introduces students to the wide range of robotics programs available to them, fueling their imaginations while enhancing their education.

As students' skill levels advance, the AUVSI Foundation hosts robotics competitions that challenge students to apply their engineering skills in the development of autonomous ground, air and maritime vehicles. To date, the AUVSI Foundation has awarded nearly $1 million in prize money to participating schools since the competitions began in 1991.

Student Competitions To attract more students to the field of robotics and with the belief that “hands-on” activities provide a much-needed opportunity to enhance traditional classroom teaching, in 1991, former-AUVSI President Prof. Robert C. Michelson, created the International Aerial Robotics Competition (IARC) while heading the organization's Technical Committee. This spawned the Intelligent Ground Vehicle Competition several years later as AUVSI Board member, Jerry Lane, a former IARC Judge, created a land version. Following suit, the RoboSub and RoboBoat competitions were established under then Executive Director Daryl Davidson. The popularity of these university student events led to the more recent Student Unmanned Air Systems Competition, and the AUVSI-sponsored Australian UAV Outback Challenge, which cater to high school and college students. The missions and requirements for each competition vary, but the common thread in each is the requirement for autonomous operation.

 Today, the AUVSI Foundation directly sponsors six annual robotic competitions and supports other annual competitions around the world. These are International Aerial Robotics Competition (IARC), Intelligent Ground Vehicle Competition (IGVC), AUVSI Foundation and ONR's International RoboSub Competition, AUVSI Foundation and ONR's International RoboBoat Competition, Student Unmanned Air Systems (SUAS) competition, and Maritime RobotX.

SeaPerch In September 2011, the AUVSI Foundation took over the management of SeaPerch, the Navy's signature K-12 Outreach program. An innovative underwater robotics program, SeaPerch teaches basic engineering and science concepts with a marine engineering theme. The move from Society of Naval Architects and Marine Engineers' (SNAME) to the AUVSI Foundation allows SeaPerch to be melded into the Foundation's other hands-on robotic programs, including the ONR-funded International RoboSub Competition. SNAME will continue to offer support for SeaPerch as part of its general program of education and outreach efforts.

RoboNation  The AUVSI Foundation was rebranded as "RoboNation" in 2017.

Online Career Center The AUVSI Career Center is an employment resource for the unmanned systems industry, offering products and services for job-seekers and employers.

Publications 

Unmanned Systems magazine is a full-color monthly periodical published by the AUVSI in Arlington, VA. Unmanned Systems highlights current global developments and unveils new technologies in air, ground, maritime, precision strike, and space unmanned systems, focusing on defense, civil and commercial markets worldwide. Unmanned Systems has an international circulation of more than 16,000.

Unmanned Systems: Mission Critical is AUVSI's quarterly electronic publication that highlights special topics in the unmanned systems and robotics industry. Each is an in-depth focus on one particular issue with information on the defense, civil and commercial applications of the technology, as well as new developments and what the future may hold. The publication seeks to draw interest in unmanned systems from new market areas around the world.

Unmanned Systems eBrief is a weekly electronic newsletter that provides a round-up of the latest global news and information about unmanned systems and robotics technologies. The newsletter includes latest roundup of industry news, AUVSI association news, federal business opportunities, as well as scientific articles related to the industry.

Membership 
The AUVSI offers both Individual and Corporate Memberships. Members come from a broad range of fields within industry, government and academia all with a shared interest in unmanned systems. Corporate members can join the association at any of seven membership levels with each level providing a varying range of benefits.

AUVSI is the leading global organization representing the views of the unmanned systems and robotics community. On behalf of its membership, AUVSI is committed to shaping global policy by advocating on behalf of the unmanned systems and robotics community, monitoring legislation and assessing the global impact of the industry to ensure that obstacles to advancing and fielding unmanned systems and robotics are removed.

The AUVSI speaks for the unmanned systems and robotics community as a trusted source of information to government officials, regulators, media and public.   AUVSI works with legislators and regulators globally and advocates for the safe and expeditious integration of UAS into the NAS, increased funding to more efficiently field UAS, and the Global continuity in standards development.

References

External links 
Association for Unmanned Vehicle Systems International

Uncrewed vehicles
Organizations established in 1972